Lewis Del Mar is the self-titled debut album by American folk pop duo Lewis Del Mar. It was released by Columbia Records in October 2016 on CD, download and 12″ vinyl.

Track listing

Personnel

Max Harwood - Composer, Engineer, Instrumentation, Producer
Daniel Miller - Composer, Engineer, Instrumentation, Producer 
Mike Deutsch - Marimba 
Drew Hart - Bass
Steve Marion - Guitar (Electric)
Andrew Maury - Engineer, Guitar (Electric), Mixing, Producer 
Tersoo Achineku - Songwriter 

Joe LaPorta - Mastering 
Maria P. Marulanda - Package Design
Daniel Topete - photography

References

2016 debut albums
Columbia Records albums